The 2020 MotoE World Cup (known officially as the 2020 FIM Enel MotoE World Cup for sponsorship reasons) was the second season of the MotoE World Cup for electric motorcycle racing, and part of the 72nd F.I.M. Grand Prix motorcycle racing season. The season calendar was significantly affected by the COVID-19 pandemic, leading to the cancellation or postponement of many races and an overall delay to the start of the season.

The season champion was Jordi Torres in his first season in the electric class, after achieving four podium finishes (including one win) and never finishing outside of the top 6. Runners-up Matteo Ferrari and Dominique Aegerter also tallied four podiums including two wins each, but retirements and poor finishes at the remaining races meant that they could not match Torres at the season's final race.

Teams and riders 
All teams used the Energica Ego Corsa motorcycles.

Rider changes

 Xavier Cardelús joined Avintia Esponsorama Racing to replace Xavier Siméon, who moved to LCR E-Team replacing Randy de Puniet.
 Dominique Aegerter made his MotoE debut with Dynavolt Intact GP replacing Jesko Raffin, who returned to a full-time entry in Moto2.
 Jordi Torres replaced Sete Gibernau at Pons Racing 40.
 Alejandro Medina joined Openbank Aspar Team to replace Nicolás Terol.
 Lukas Tulovic and Tommaso Marcon replaced Kenny Foray and Héctor Garzó at Tech3 E-Racing.
 Alessandro Zaccone replaced compatriot Lorenzo Savadori at Trentino Gresini MotoE.
 Jakub Kornfeil replaced Bradley Smith at WithU Motorsport shortly before the season start, as Smith returned to MotoGP to replace the suspended Andrea Iannone at Aprilia Gresini.

Regulation changes
In case two races are held in the same weekend, the E-Pole qualifying session determines the starting grid for Race 1, while the grid for Race 2 features the riders in the order they have finished Race 1, followed by the non-classified riders sorted by qualifying time. Previously, both races were run with the same starting grid, based on E-Pole results.  Only the pole rider of the first race of a weekend is credited with a pole position; the polesitter for the second race is not officially recorded for the rider.

Calendar
The MotoE provisional calendar, released in September 2019, featured six races in five venues, supporting the Spanish, French, Dutch, Austrian and San Marino Grands Prix—the latter being a double-header; an additional race was added in December 2019, when a double-header in Valencia replaced the single French race.

As a revised schedule was released in June 2020 in response to the COVID-19 pandemic, the following Grands Prix took place in 2020.

The following rounds were cancelled or were removed from the updated MotoE schedule in response to the COVID-19 pandemic:

Calendar changes as a reaction to coronavirus pandemic
The season calendar was significantly affected by the COVID-19 pandemic, leading to the cancellation or postponement of many races and an overall delay to the start of the season.

The Spanish Grand Prix, due to be held on 3 May, was postponed on 26 March. Its date was later set to 19 July.
The Dutch TT was postponed on 23 April after the Dutch government announced a ban on all mass events until at least 1 September. It was subsequently cancelled on 29 April.
The Austrian and Valencian Community Grand Prix, which were confirmed on the overall MotoGP calendar, were not part of the revised MotoE schedule.
The San Marino Grand Prix, which was due to host a double-header round, became a single-header event. A double-header to be held at the same track was added for the following week, as part of the Emilia Romagna Grand Prix.
A second event at Jerez, named after Andalusia, and a double-header at the French Grand Prix, were also added to the revised schedule.

Results and standings

Grands Prix

Cup standings
Scoring system
Points were awarded to the top fifteen finishers. A rider had to finish the race to earn points.

Notes

References

MotoE
Grand Prix motorcycle racing seasons
MotoE